Solar probe can refer to:

the NASA Solar Probe mission (now named "Parker Solar Probe")
List of Solar System probes, which includes many solar probes